This is a list of government-sponsored investigations or reports related to UFOs.

Brazil 
 Operação Prato

Canada 
 Project Magnet

France 
 GEPAN / SEPRA / GEIPAN

Soviet Union 
 Institute 22

United Kingdom 
 Flying Saucer Working Party
 Project Condign

United States 
 Advanced Aerospace Threat Identification Program
 Roswell UFO incident
 Brookings Report
 Condon Committee
 Estimate of the Situation
 Project Blue Book
 Project Grudge
 Project Serpo
 Project Sign
 Project Silver Bug
 Robertson Panel
 Unidentified Aerial Phenomena Task Force (UAPTF)

External links
 Cia      CIA's Role in the Study of UFOs, 1947-90 — Central Intelligence Agency
 Canada   Canada's UFOs: The search for the unknown
 University of Colorado   UCB Libraries | Government Publications Library | UFOs
 UK National Archives The National Archives - Homepage

UFO-related lists